Cherrytree Run is a  long 2nd order tributary to Oil Creek in Venango County, Pennsylvania.  This run has the same name as the township, Cherrytree Township, that it drains.

Variant names
According to the Geographic Names Information System, it has also been known historically as:  
Cherry Tree Run

Course
Cherrytree Run rises on the Prather Creek divide about 0.5 miles west of Toonerville, Pennsylvania.  Cherrytree Run then flows south to meet Oil Creek at the Rynd Farm.

Watershed
Cherrytree Run drains  of area, receives about 44.9 in/year of precipitation, has a topographic wetness index of 429.10, and has an average water temperature of 7.79 °C.  The watershed is 75% forested.

References

Additional Maps

Rivers of Venango County, Pennsylvania
Rivers of Pennsylvania
Tributaries of the Allegheny River